Natalia Kusendova is a Canadian politician, who was elected to the Legislative Assembly of Ontario in the 2018 provincial election. She holds Bachelor of Science Degrees in Human and Molecular Biology from the University of Toronto, and in Nursing from Nipissing University. In addition, she speaks five languages: English, Polish, French, Czech and Slovak. She represents the riding of Mississauga Centre as a member of the Progressive Conservative Party of Ontario.  Before being elected, she worked as a nurse. Kusendova is of Slovak and Polish descent.

In March 2020, while the province was under a state of emergency due to the COVID-19 pandemic in Canada, Kusendova started taking 12-hour shifts in the emergency department at Etobicoke General Hospital.

In September 2020, Kusendova's bill to recognize the Franco-Ontarian flag as an emblem of the province of Ontario was passed by the Ontario legislature and into law.

Electoral record

References

External links
 

Progressive Conservative Party of Ontario MPPs
Living people
Politicians from Mississauga
Women MPPs in Ontario
Canadian people of Polish descent
Canadian people of Slovak descent
Canadian nurses
Canadian women nurses
21st-century Canadian politicians
21st-century Canadian women politicians
Year of birth missing (living people)